The 2011 Big Ten men's basketball tournament was held from March 10 through March 13, 2011 at Conseco Fieldhouse in Indianapolis, Indiana. It was the fourteenth annual Big Ten men's basketball tournament. The championship was won by Ohio State who defeated Penn State in the championship game. As a result, Ohio State received the Big Ten's automatic bid to the NCAA tournament. The win marked Ohio State's fourth tournament championship and second consecutive (one championship has been vacated).

Seeds
All Big Ten schools played in the tournament. Teams were seeded by conference record, with a tiebreaker system used to seed teams with identical conference records. Seeding for the tournament was determined at the close of the regular conference season. The top five teams received a first round bye.

Schedule

Bracket

Honors

All-Tournament Team
 Jared Sullinger, Ohio State – Big Ten tournament Most Outstanding Player
 Kalin Lucas, Michigan State
 Michael Thompson, Northwestern
 Jon Diebler, Ohio State
 William Buford, Ohio State
 Talor Battle, Penn State

References

Big Ten men's basketball tournament
Tournament
Big Ten Conference men's basketball tournament
Big Ten men's basketball tournament
Big Ten